Ruben Guthrie is a 2015 Australian romantic drama film starring Patrick Brammall as the title character, with Alex Dimitriades and Abbey Lee Kershaw in supporting roles. The film was written and directed by Brendan Cowell, based on his play of the same name.

Plot summary
Life is good for Ruben Guthrie (Patrick Brammall), who works as an advertisement executive and leads a lifestyle of a party boy and lives in a house on the water with his model fiancée. He's at the top of his game until Ruben lands at the bottom of his infinity pool from some drunken skylarking. Ruben's fiancée leaves him, but says she'll get back with him if he can go a year without drinking.

Cast
Patrick Brammall as Ruben Guthrie
Abbey Lee Kershaw as Zoya Houbec
Alex Dimitriades as Damian
Harriet Dyer as Virginia
Yvonne Cowell as Vonny
Jeremy Sims as Ray
Aaron Bertram as Ken
Michael Lahoud as Jeremy
Brenton Thwaites as Chet
Robyn Nevin as Susan Guthrie
Jack Thompson as Peter Guthrie
Blazey Best as Janelle
Elly Oh as Sun Ye
Natasha Beaumont as Sheridan
Bill Thompson as Harry
Leon Ford as Dimitri
Francis Mossman as Lorenzo Oil

Production
The screenplay, written by Brendan Cowell, is based on his play of the same name.

Reception
Ruben Guthrie received mixed to positive reviews from critics, earning a 60% approval rating on Rotten Tomatoes, based on 10 reviews.

Luke Buckmaster of "Guardian" called it "an initially archetypal trajectory (boy loses girl; boy goes on mission to get her back) becomes something curlier and less conventional." CJ Johnson of ABC Radio gave a positive review, saying it "sails breezily along with terrific dialogue, great performances and an extremely relatable story. It's excellent contemporary entertainment, the kind of character and situation-based comedy the French do so well but Australian cinema, not so much."

Jim Schembri of 3AW gave a negative review, writing "It might be a case of something essential getting lost in the translation, but first-time director Brendan Cowell's adaptation of his play about an alcoholic advertising man on the road to redemption is a well-intentioned mess."

Accolades

References

External links
 
 

2015 romantic drama films
Australian romantic drama films
2015 films
2010s English-language films